USS Jacob Jones (Destroyer No. 61/DD-61) was a  built for the United States Navy prior to the American entry into World War I. The ship was the first U.S. Navy vessel named in honor of Jacob Jones.

Jacob Jones was laid down by the New York Shipbuilding of Camden, New Jersey, in August 1914 and launched in May of the following year. She was armed with four  guns and had eight 21 inch (533 mm) torpedo tubes.

After her February 1916 commissioning, Jacob Jones conducted patrols off the New England coast. After the United States entered World War I in April 1917, Jacob Jones was sent overseas. Patrolling the Irish Sea out of Queenstown, Ireland, Jacob Jones rescued the survivors of several ships, picking up over 300 from the sunken Armed merchant cruiser .

On 6 December, Jacob Jones was steaming independently from Brest, France, for Queenstown, when she was torpedoed and sunk by German submarine  with the loss of 66 men, becoming the first United States destroyer sunk by enemy action. Jacob Jones sank in eight minutes without issuing a distress call; the German submarine commander, Kapitänleutnant Hans Rose, after taking two badly injured Jacob Jones crewmen aboard his submarine, radioed the U.S. base at Queenstown with the coordinates for the survivors.  The Veterans of Foreign Wars post in Dedham, Massachusetts is named for the ship.

Design and construction 
Construction of the vessel was awarded to New York Shipbuilding of Camden, New Jersey, which laid down her keel on 3 August 1914. Ten months later, on 29 May 1915, Jacob Jones was launched by sponsor Mrs. Jerome Parker Crittenden (née Paulina Cazenove Jones), a great-granddaughter of the ship's namesake, Commodore Jacob Jones (1768–1850), a U.S. Navy officer during the War of 1812.

Jacob Jones had two Curtis steam turbines that drove her two screw propellers, and an additional steam turbine geared to one of the propeller shafts for cruising purposes.

Jacob Jones was also equipped with eight  torpedo tubes. The General Board of the United States Navy had called for two anti-aircraft guns for the Tucker-class ships, as well as provisions for laying up to 36 floating mines. From sources, it is unclear if these recommendations were followed for Jacob Jones or any of the other ships of the class.

United States Navy career 
USS Jacob Jones was commissioned into the United States Navy on 10 February 1916 under the command of Lieutenant Commander William S. Pye. Following her commissioning, Jacob Jones conducted training exercises off the New England coast, and then entered the Philadelphia Navy Yard for repairs.  On 3 Feb. 1917, the day the United States broke diplomatic relations with Germany, the ship nearly sank in the naval yard. Contemporary reports said it might have been an act of sabotage. Upon the United States' entry into World War I on 6 April 1917, Jacob Jones patrolled off the coast of Virginia. She sailed from Boston for Europe on 7 May with a group of destroyers that included , and arrived at Queenstown, Ireland, on 17 May.

Jacob Jones duties at Queenstown involved patrolling and escorting convoys in the Irish Sea and making occasional rescues of survivors of sunken ships. While escorting British steamship  two weeks later, lookouts on Jacob Jones sighted a periscope, but before the destroyer could make an attack on the submarine,  torpedoed and sank the steamship. Jacob Jones was able to take on 26 of Dafilas 28-member crew after the ship went down.

On 19 October, the British Armed merchant cruiser  and ten destroyers, including Jacob Jones, were escorting an eastbound convoy of twenty steamers, when German submarine  surfaced in the midst of the group. The submarine launched its only remaining torpedo at Orama, sinking that vessel. While sister ship  saw and depth charged U-62 (to no avail), Jacob Jones turned her attentions to rescuing Oramas survivors, gathering 309.

Sinking 
In early December, Jacob Jones helped escort a convoy to Brest, France, with five other Queenstown-based destroyers. The last to depart from Brest on the return to Ireland, Jacob Jones was steaming alone in a zig-zag pattern when she was spotted by Kapitänleutnant Hans Rose on the German submarine . At 16:20 on 6 December 1917, near position , lookouts on Jacob Jones spotted a torpedo  distant headed for the ship's starboard side. Despite having her rudder put hard left and emergency speed rung up, Jacob Jones was unable to move out of the way, and the torpedo struck her rudder. Even though the depth charges did not explode, Jacob Jones was adrift. The jolt had knocked out power, so the destroyer was unable to send a distress signal; since she was steaming alone, no other ship was present to know of Jacob Jones predicament.

Commander David W. Bagley, the destroyer's commander, ordered all life rafts and boats launched. As the ship sank, her bow raised in the air almost vertically before she began to slip beneath the waves. At this point the armed depth charges began to explode, killing men who had been unable to escape the destroyer, and stunning many others in the water. The destroyer, the first United States destroyer ever lost to enemy action, sank eight minutes after the torpedo struck the rudder, taking with her two officers and 64 men.

Several of the crew—most notably Lieutenant, Junior Grade, Stanton F. Kalk, the officer-of-the-deck when the torpedo struck—began to get men out of the water and into the life rafts. Kalk worked in the cold Atlantic water to equalize the load among the various rafts, but died of exhaustion and exposure.

Bagley noted in his official account that about 30 minutes after Jacob Jones sank, the German submarine surfaced about two to three miles from the collection of rafts and took one of the American sailors on board. According to Uboat.net, what Rose of U-53 had done was surface and take aboard two badly injured American sailors. Rose had also radioed the American base at Queenstown with the approximate coordinates of the sinking before departing the area.

Bagley, unaware of Rose's humanitarian gesture, left most of the food, water, and medical supplies with Lieutenant Commander John K. Richards, whom he left in charge of the assembled rafts. Bagley, Lieutenant Commander Norman Scott (Jacob Jones executive officer) and four crewmen (brought along to row), set out for aid in the nearby Isles of Scilly. At 13:00 on 7 December, Bagley's group was sighted by a British patrol vessel just six nautical miles (11 km) from their destination. The group was relieved to find that the British sloop  had found and taken aboard most of the survivors earlier that morning; a small group had been rescued on the night of the sinking by the American steamer .

Several men were recognized for their actions in the aftermath of the torpedo attack. Kalk (posthumously) and Bagley received the Navy Distinguished Service Medal. Others honored included Chief Boatswain's Mate Harry Gibson (posthumously) and Chief Electrician's Mate L. J. Kelly, who both received the Navy Cross; and Richards, Scott, and Chief Boatswain's Mate Charles Charlesworth all received letters of commendation. Rose was awarded the Pour le Mérite and Ritterkreuz des Hohenzollerschen Hausordens mit Schwertern for this and other achievements in the tonnage war.

Wreck located

Numerous artifacts were located, including the ship's bell.

See also 
  – a United States Navy destroyer sunk prior to the American entry into World War II.
  - namesake sunk by torpedo during the Second World War

Notes

References

Bibliography

External links 
 
USS Jacob Jones website at Destroyer History Foundation

 

Tucker-class destroyers
Ships built by New York Shipbuilding Corporation
1915 ships
World War I destroyers of the United States
Ships sunk by German submarines in World War I
Maritime incidents in 1917
World War I shipwrecks in the Atlantic Ocean
Shipwrecks of the Isles of Scilly
Cornish shipwrecks